Heart of Virginia is a 1948 American sports drama film directed by R. G. Springsteen and starring Janet Martin, Robert Lowery and Frankie Darro. Believing that he is responsible for the death of a fellow rider, a jockey develops a fear of the racetrack.

The film's art direction was by Frank Arrigo.

Plot
Racehorse owner Whit Galtry wants his horse Virginia's Pride to win so he can buy a new automobile for his daughter Virginia. He pressures jockey Jimmy Easter to do whatever it takes to finish first, but Jimmy inadvertently causes an accident that results in the death of another horse's rider.

A distraught Jimmy quits racing. Virginia's horse interests wealthy stable owner Dan Lockwood, who soon demonstrates an interest in her as well. Jimmy reluctantly trains and rides the horse, but when Virginia's Pride is injured, her father beats Jimmy with a whip. Dan seems to lose interest in Virginia when her horse is hurt, but ultimately both the horse and the romance are successful.

Cast
 Janet Martin as Virginia Galtry  
 Robert Lowery as Dan Lockwood 
 Frankie Darro as Jimmy Easter  
 Paul Hurst as Whit Galtry  
 Sam McDaniel as 'Sunflower' Jones  
 Tom Chatterton as Dr. Purdy  
 Benny Bartlett as 'Breezy' Brent  
 Glen Vernon as Bud Landeen  
 Edmund Cobb as Gas Station Attendant

References

Bibliography
  Len D. Martin. The Republic Pictures Checklist: Features, Serials, Cartoons, Short Subjects and Training Films of Republic Pictures Corporation, 1935-1959. McFarland, 1998.

External links
 

1948 films
1940s sports drama films
American sports drama films
Films directed by R. G. Springsteen
Republic Pictures films
American horse racing films
American black-and-white films
1948 drama films
1940s English-language films
1940s American films